P. V. Kathiravan is an Indian politician and former Member of the Tamil Nadu Legislative Assembly from the Usilampatti constituency. He represents the All India Forward Bloc party. He is the National deputy chairman and Tamil Nadu state general secretary of All India forward bloc

Kathiravan is a nephew of P. N. Vallarasu, who won the Usilampatti constituency in 1989 and 1996.

References 

Tamil Nadu MLAs 2011–2016
Living people
Year of birth missing (living people)
All India Forward Bloc politicians